The Browningieae are a tribe of cacti belonging to the Cactoideae subfamily.

Description
Browningieae are large tree-like or shrubby plants. Their columnar shoots are articulated or not articulated. The ribs are usually heavily spined. The medium to large flowers appearing on the side usually open at night. Their pericarpel has imbricated scales. The areoles have thorns or bristles. The fleshy fruits are not bursting, scaly, thorned or glabrous. The medium-sized to large seeds are often wrinkled. The hilum and micropyle of the seeds are fused, an appendage is absent, and a mucous sheath is sometimes present.

Genera

References

Cactoideae
Caryophyllales tribes